Edward Lancelot Bunting (10 December 1883 – 26 February 1962) was an English cricketer who played a single first-class match in 1922, for Worcestershire against Yorkshire.

His brief experience of the first-class game was not successful: Yorkshire, who would go on to the County Championship title, beat their opponents by an innings and 220 runs inside two days. Bunting himself made 1 and 0, with his four overs of leg-spin going for 38 runs, though he took a catch to dismiss George Macaulay.

Bunting was born in Tillington, Staffordshire; he died in Barnwood, Gloucestershire aged 78.

External links
 
 Statistical summary from CricketArchive

1883 births
1962 deaths
English cricketers
Worcestershire cricketers
Sportspeople from Staffordshire